Valner Franković (born 9 July 1968) is a Croatian former handball player.

Franković played for the younger selections of the Yugoslav national handball team. He played and won two Balkan Cups, 1988 Romania and 1989 Bulgaria as well as a bronze medal at IHF Men's Junior World Championship in 1989.

He played for the Croatia national handball team at the 1996 Summer Olympics in Atlanta, where Croatia won the gold medal.

Honours
Zamet
Yugoslav Second League (1): 1986-87
Croatian Championship U-21 (1): 1990
Croatian A First League Runner-up (1): 1991-92

Rudar Labin
Croatian First B League - South (1): 1992-93

Badel 1862 Zagreb
Croatian A First League (2): 1993-94, 1994-95
Croatian Cup (2): 1994, 1995
EHF Champions League Finalist (1): 1994-95

Karlovačka Banka
Croatian A First League Runner-up (1): 1995-96
Croatian Cup Finalist (1): 1997

References

1968 births
Living people
Croatian male handball players
Olympic handball players of Croatia
Handball players at the 1996 Summer Olympics
Olympic gold medalists for Croatia
Olympic medalists in handball
Handball players from Rijeka
RK Zamet players
RK Zagreb players
Croatian expatriate sportspeople in Italy

Medalists at the 1996 Summer Olympics
Mediterranean Games gold medalists for Croatia
Competitors at the 1997 Mediterranean Games
Mediterranean Games medalists in handball